Haaslava is a village in Kastre Parish, Tartu County in eastern Estonia.

Politician Aksel Herman Rüütli (1893–1976) was born and raised in Haaslava.

References

 

Villages in Tartu County
Kreis Dorpat